Mazing Man is the title character of a comic book series created by Bob Rozakis and Stephen DeStefano and published by DC Comics. The series ran for twelve issues in 1986, with additional special issues in 1987, 1988, and 1990. Additionally, a 'Mazing Man origin story was featured in Secret Origins #16, and an original one-page story that appeared as an ad in Comics Buyer's Guide.

Series overview 
The Mazing Man series depicts the misadventures of Sigfried Horatio Hunch III, a benignly deranged little man in Queens, New York City, New York who dresses in a homemade costume and performs deeds like unclogging drains and watching out for local children. Viewed as a harmless kook by his neighbors, he saves a child from being hit by a truck in the first issue, earning him some respect and notoriety, not to mention a steady stream of appreciation (and food) from the mother in subsequent issues.

"'Maze" tends to sing Simon and Garfunkel songs when struck on the head. His best friend is Denton Fixx, a writer for BC Comics who looks like a dog. Hunch is a millionaire, having won first place in a magazine subscription company's sweepstakes. After winning the prize, he felt obligated to subscribe to all of the company's magazines. As a result, he receives a staggering load of publications daily, including the pornographic magazines that he genuinely reads only for the articles. He does not keep his wealth a secret per se; he simply does not mention it and does not live an opulent lifestyle. His friends are unaware of his financial success.

Reception
The original series, although highly acclaimed, was short-lived. Comics artist Frank Miller admired the series. Eager to help the property survive, Miller contributed a cover with the lead characters of the extremely popular mini-series Batman: The Dark Knight Returns for the last issue. The resulting exposure created enough interest for three subsequent one-shot issues.

A back-up feature, "Zoot Sputnik", drawn by Fred Hembeck and (ostensibly) written by Denton Fixx, appeared for several issues; it was supposed to be the book Fixx wrote for BC Comics. "Zoot Sputnik" was a parody of the Golden Age narrative style where stories had no between-issue continuity — Zoot and his team were space adventurers in one issue and cowboys in the next. The team's dog received a shock of energy and gained the ability to remember their disparate adventures. This was Denton's attempt to introduce continuity to the book, but it was met with disapproval by his editor.

Mazing Man is one of a handful of DC titles to publish an issue not featuring the Comics Code Authority stamp of approval while it was active. In the issue "Writer's Block", Denton is stuck for a story, and all his friends give their ideas. One of them dealt with an army of zombies. Although there was no gore or violence, any mention of the living dead, specifically the use of the word "zombie", was forbidden by the Comics Code. The issue was released without the seal, with no publicity, positive or negative.

Much later, in the Ambush Bug: Year None miniseries, 'Mazing Man (in the same nonsensical way of the series) is revealed to be on death row.

Other characters 
Denton Fixx 'Maze's best friend and writer for BC Comics. Although human, he resembles a dog.
Brenda Valentine A rising star at a local advertising agency. She is married to Eddie Valentine.
Eddie Valentine Assistant to the Assistant Manager, later promoted to Assistant Manager, at the South Richmond Bank. Eddie is married to Brenda. He plays baseball recreationally and is a Gold Glove winner at John Quincy High School.
K.P. Watson Denton's half-sister.
Guido Garibaldi A jock simpleton who lives in the same building as Denton, 'Maze, Eddie and Brenda. He works in three shoe stores and spends most of his time wondering which one he's called in sick at, drinking beer and hopelessly pursuing women.
Sgt. Muldavey A local police officer who is plagued by 'Maze's "heroics".
Mrs. Costinas Landlady of Maze, Denton and K.P., Costinas is most often seen sweeping the front steps of their building. She never smiles and usually grunts at all passersby.
Helenita Trialdo A baby whose appearances revolve around her lack of hair.
Senora Tiraldo Helenita's mother.
Walter Vanderplatz Eddie's supervisor at the South Richmond Bank. He is more than a bit of a stuffed shirt.

In other media

Television
 'Mazing Man appears in the Batman: The Brave and the Bold episode "Four Star Spectacular!", voiced by Tom Kenny. In the "Kitty Catastrophe" segment, he is the accident-prone catsitter for a couple named Owen and Fiona. It is apparent that Batman is his favorite superhero and the inspiration for his costume.

See also
 List of DC Comics publications

References

External links 
 'Mazing Man at Don Markstein's Toonopedia. Archived from the original on February 17, 2016.

DC Comics titles
1986 comics debuts
Comics characters introduced in 1986
Humor comics
Fictional characters with schizophrenia
Fictional characters from New York City